This is a list of diplomatic missions in Argentina. There are currently 84 embassies in Buenos Aires, and many countries maintain consulates in other Argentine cities (not including honorary consulates).

Diplomatic missions in Buenos Aires

Embassies

Other missions or delegations 
 (Economic & Cultural Office)
 (Delegation)
 (Delegation)

Gallery of embassies

Consular missions

Bahía Blanca
 (Consulate)
 Consulate-General
 Consulate-General

Bariloche
 (Consulate General)

Clorinda
 (Consulate)

Comodoro Rivadavia
 (Consulate)

Colón
 (Consulate)

Concordia
 (Consulate)

Córdoba

 Consulate
 Consulate-General
 (Consulate General)
 Consulate-General
 (Consulate)
 (Consulate General)
 Consulate-General
 (Consulate-General)

Corrientes
 Consulate

Formosa
 (Consulate)

Gualeguaychú
 (Consulate)

Jujuy
 Consulate

La Plata
 Consulate-General
 (Consulate)
 (Consulate General)

La Quiaca
 Consulate

Lomas de Zamora
 Consular Agency

Mar del Plata
 (Consulate)
 Consulate

Mendoza

 Consulate
 Consulate-General
 (Consulate General)
 Consulate
 (Consulate)
 (Consulate General)
 Consulate-General

Morón
 Consular Agency

Neuquén
 (Consulate General)

Orán
 Consulate

Paso de los Libres
 Consulate

Pocito
 Consulate

Posadas
 (Consulate)

Puerto Iguazú
 Consulate
 (Consulate)

Resistencia
 (Consulate)

Río Gallegos
 (Consulate General)

Río Grande, Tierra del Fuego
 (Consulate)

Rosario

 Consulate
 (Consulate General)
 Consulate-General
 (Consulate)
 Consulate-General
 (Consulate-General)

Salta
 Consulate
 (Consulate General)
 (Consulate)

San Justo
 (Consulate)

Ushuaia
 (Consulate)

Viedma
 Consulate

Non-resident embassies accredited to Argentina 
Resident in Brasilia, Brazil:

 

 

Resident in Washington, D.C., United States of America:

 
 

Resident in other cities:

 (Ottawa)
 (Ottawa)
 (New York City)
 (Madrid)
 (Valletta)
 (Rome)

Closed missions

See also 
 Foreign relations of Argentina
 Visa requirements for Argentine citizens

References

External links 
 Ministry of Foreign Affairs of Argentina (Spanish)

List
Diplomatic
Argentina